The Sri Lankans records in swimming are the fastest ever performances of swimmers from Sri Lanka, which are recognised and ratified by the Sri Lanka Aquatic Sports Union.

All records were set in finals unless noted otherwise.

Long Course (50 m)

Men

Women

Mixed relay

Short Course (25 m)

Men

Women

Mixed relay

References

External links
Sri Lanka Aquatic Sports Union

Sri Lanka
Records
Swimming